Yamano may refer to:

 Yamano Music, a famous CD shop of Japan. the head office is Ginza. 
 Aiko Yamano, a Japanese beautician and founder of Yamano group. 
 Atsuko Yamano, a founding member of the Japanese rock trio Shonen Knife
 Naoko Yamano, a founding member of the Japanese rock trio Shonen Knife
 Takayoshi Yamano, a former Japanese  football player
 Sharin Yamano, a Japanese manga creator
 Yamano-kai, a now-disbanded yakuza gang based in Kumamoto, Kyūshū, Japan
 Satoko Yamano (voice actress), a Japanese voice actress
 Yamano College of Aesthetics, a private junior college in Hachioji, Tokyo, Japan

Japanese-language surnames